Nickelodeon is a children's cable/satellite television channel which launched on 10 December 1997.

History
Nickelodeon was launched on 10 December 1997 on cable by Turkish company RTV and timeshared with Discovery Channel Turkey.

In 2001, Multi Channel Developers took over Nickelodeon's license, thus making it a 24-hour channel.

On 31 March 2010, Nickelodeon had a major rebrand with new idents and a new logo.

On 22 May 2010, Nickelodeon and MTV Turkey were taken off of Digiturk, most likely due to disagreement issues.

On 2 June 2010, Nickelodeon and MTV Turkey's websites were shut down, due to an argument between MCD and Viacom.

On 31 August 2011, Viacom ended MCD's license of the two channels, thus getting the local channels shut down. Nickelodeon and MTV Europe later started broadcasting in English on D-Smart.

In February 2012, Viacom reached an agreement with Digiturk and brought back Nickelodeon and MTV to Turkey. Starting on 1 March 2012, Nickelodeon still broadcasts in Turkish today and starting with Polish version, while MTV has Turkish subtitles over the European feed.

On 1 May 2012, the Nick Jr. channel came to Turkey and mainly broadcasts preschooler shows for young kids aged 2–8 and is a 24-hour kid's channel much like Nickelodeon.

On 1 July 2012, Nickelodeon HD launched. It became Turkey's first and, as of now, only HD kids channel.

In October 2012, the channel separated from the Polish version.

In Summer 2018, Nickelodeon Turkey is starting with the CEE feed, using the Hungarian version. Later In 2019, Nickelodeon Turkey now uses the Romanian version.

External links
 Nickelodeon Turkey

Turkey
Turkish animation
Television stations in Turkey
Children's television channels in Turkey
Television channels and stations established in 1997
Children's television networks
1997 establishments in Turkey